The Metropolitan Cathedral of Guayaquil (officially the Cathedral of Saint Peter) is a cathedral in the center of Guayaquil, Ecuador.

The current cathedral is the successor of the cathedral that was Guayaquil's main cathedral at the time of the city's founding. The original cathedral was made of wood and located on Santa Ana Hill. This cathedral was destroyed in a fire in 1892.

The current building was constructed in a neo-Gothic style between 1924 and 1937. It is located on Calle Chimborazo between Avenida 10 de Agosto and Avenida Clemente Ballén.

References

Buildings and structures in Guayaquil
Roman Catholic cathedrals in Ecuador
Gothic Revival church buildings in Ecuador
Tourist attractions in Guayaquil
Roman Catholic churches completed in 1937
20th-century Roman Catholic church buildings in Ecuador